The 2021 Big East Conference baseball tournament will be held at Prasco Park in Mason, Ohio, from May 27 through 30. The event, held at the end of the conference regular season, determines the champion of the Big East Conference for the 2021 season.  The winner of the double-elimination tournament will receive the conference's automatic bid to the 2021 NCAA Division I baseball tournament.

Format and seeding
The tournament will use a double-elimination format and feature the top four finishers of the Big East's eight teams.  They will be seeded by conference winning percentage.

Tournament

Bracket

Game results

References

Tournament
Big East Conference Baseball Tournament
Big East Conference baseball tournament
Big East Conference baseball tournament
College baseball tournaments in Ohio
Sports competitions in Mason, Ohio